Charles Fredrick Adamson (June 11, 1936 – February 22, 2008) was an American police officer who served with the Chicago Police Department as a Sergeant Detective from 1958 to 1974. He later became a television producer and screenwriter.

Adamson was best known for creating the television crime drama Crime Story, for which he won a People's Choice Award, and for writing episodes of Miami Vice. The 1995 film Heat, starring Robert De Niro and Al Pacino and directed by Michael Mann, is based on one of Adamson's more famous cases in Chicago from the 1960s.

He died in 2008 from lung cancer at age 71. Michael Mann's 2009 film Public Enemies stated in its end credits "In memory of Chuck Adamson".

Filmography

References

External links
 

1936 births
2008 deaths
Chicago Police Department officers
American television producers
American male screenwriters
American television writers
American male television writers
20th-century American male writers
20th-century American screenwriters